Yang Zi (杨子; born 12 September 1993 in Shenzhen) is a Chinese former tennis player.

Yang reached a career-high singles ranking of 303, achieved on 23 September 2013. Her career-high doubles ranking of 546, she set on 27 May 2013.

Yang made her WTA Tour debut at the 2011 Guangzhou International Women's Open, in the doubles event partnering Pang Yang, losing in the first round.

ITF Circuit finals

Singles: 4 (0–4)

Doubles: 2 (0–2)

External links
 
 

1993 births
Living people
Chinese female tennis players
Sportspeople from Shenzhen
Tennis players from Guangdong
21st-century Chinese women